Nira Windeatt (Nira Steve; born 7 December 1958) is an Australian former swimmer. She competed in the women's 100 metre butterfly at the 1976 Summer Olympics.

She married Graham Windeatt in 1979 and has two children with him.

References

External links
 Nira Windeatt at olympics.com.au
 Nira Stove – first female Olympian of the Parkes Shire! in historyparkes.org
 

1958 births
Living people
Australian female butterfly swimmers
Olympic swimmers of Australia
Swimmers at the 1976 Summer Olympics
Place of birth missing (living people)
20th-century Australian women
21st-century Australian women